Soberanismo (lit. "pursuit of sovereignty") is a term used in the Spanish language when referring to different political movements that seek a non-subordinated status for certain autonomous or semi-autonomous territories, and may refer to:

Free association movement in Puerto Rico
Catalan independence movement in Spain and France
Basque independence movement in Spain and France

See also
Souverainism